Eva Silva Madarang (born September 13, 1997) is a footballer who plays as a right back. Born in the United States, she represents the Philippines women's national team.

College career
In college soccer, Madarang played for Moorpark College. In 2016, she was named the team's MVP. In January 2017, she was among the players who were named into the All-Western State Conference North Division first team after leading her team to a Western State North Championships. She also a two time honoree of the 100% Hustle Award. Starting September 2017, she played for the Rogers State University in NCAA Division II.

Club career

Doncaster Rovers Belles
Madarang signed for Doncaster Rovers Belles in September 2019, with the two-time national champions languishing in the FA Women's National League Division One Midlands. The league's 2019–20 season was cancelled due to the COVID-19 pandemic.

Roma CF
In 2020, Madarang was signed for Roma Calcio Femminile (Roma C.F.), a A.S. Roma affiliate, of the Italian Serie B.

Pozoalbense
In July 2021, she moved to CD Pozoalbense of Spain's Segunda División Pro.

International career
Madarang's father is Filipino, making her eligible to play for her father's homeland. She went to the Philippines to try out for the country's national team with low expectations but made it to the final squad that participated in the 2018 AFC Women's Asian Cup qualifiers. The Philippines qualified for the tournament final with her scoring four goals in five games as a striker. Prior to the qualifiers, she was trained in her natural position of left back.

Madarang was among the players named to the national team that participated at the 2017 Southeast Asian Games. However she sustained an injury on August 8, 2017 during a training camp in Japan, a few days before the regional tournament. The coaching staff decided not to play her so she could be fit enough to play at the 2018 AFC Women's Asian Cup.

International goals
Scores and results list the Philippines' goal tally first.

Honours

International

Philippines
Southeast Asian Games third place: 2021
AFF Women's Championship: 2022

Education
In 2019, she graduated from Rogers State University in Oklahoma.  In 2020, she decided to pursue a Master's degree.

Businesses and social media
She makes a YouTube channel called Eva's World. Her channel is not about soccer, but shows trips she took with the Philippines women's national team and videos from England when she played for a club there. To lose weight, she became a vegan, and she makes videos about eating vegan. She enjoys filming and photography. She made ESM Photographs from her name, Eva Silva Madarang. She made a clothing business called Eva's Closet.

References

External links
 Moorpark profile
 YouTube channel
 Photography business 
 Photography Instagram
 Personal Instagram
 Clothing business website

1997 births
Living people
Filipino women's footballers
Philippines women's international footballers
People from Thousand Oaks, California
American sportspeople of Filipino descent
American people of Spanish descent
Sportspeople of Spanish descent
Citizens of the Philippines through descent
Filipino people of Spanish descent
American women's soccer players
Moorpark College alumni
Rogers State Hillcats women's soccer players
Sportspeople from Ventura County, California
Women's association football utility players
Women's association football fullbacks
Women's association football midfielders
Women's association football forwards
Doncaster Rovers Belles L.F.C. players
Expatriate women's footballers in England
Competitors at the 2017 Southeast Asian Games
Competitors at the 2019 Southeast Asian Games
Citizens of Spain through descent
Spanish women's footballers
Segunda Federación (women) players
Spanish people of Filipino descent
Southeast Asian Games bronze medalists for the Philippines
Southeast Asian Games medalists in football
Competitors at the 2021 Southeast Asian Games